Ceralocyna fulvipes is a species of beetle in the family Cerambycidae. It was described by Viana in 1971.

References

Ceralocyna
Beetles described in 1971